Wuchalu Township is a township in Mangshi, Yunnan, China. It is surrounded by Wangzishu Township on the north, Jiangdong Township on the northeast, Xishan Township on the west, Xuangang Township on the east, and Santaishan Palaung Ethnic Township on the south.

Administrative division
As of December 2015, the township is divided into 6 villages: 
 Wuchalu
 Liangzijie
 Mangbeng
 Wandan
 Shiban
 Xinzhai

Geography
It belongs to the subtropical mountain climate. The forest coverage rate reaches 59.3%.

The Longchuan River flows through the township.

Economy
The local economy is primarily based upon agriculture and animal husbandry. Cash crops are mainly sugarcane, tea, nuts, walnuts, sugar oranges, and tobacco.

Education
 Wuchalu Township Central Primary School
 Wuchalu Township Middle School

Transport
The Provincial Highway S318 runs east to west through the township.

The County Road X024 passes across the township north to south.

References

Divisions of Mangshi